The 1984 NCAA Division I Men's Golf Championships were contested at the 46th annual NCAA-sanctioned golf tournament for determining the individual and team national champions of men's collegiate golf at the Division I level in the United States.

The tournament was held at the Bear Creek Golf World in Houston, Texas.

Houston won the team championship, the Cougars' then-record fifteenth NCAA title.

John Inman, from North Carolina, won the individual title.

Individual results

Individual champion
 John Inman, North Carolina

Team results

Finalists

Missed cut

DC = Defending champions
Debut appearance

References

NCAA Men's Golf Championship
Golf in Texas
NCAA Golf Championship
NCAA Golf Championship
NCAA Golf Championship